Alijula (also Romanized as ‘Alījūlā; also known as Ālūjūlā) is a village in Charuymaq-e Jonubesharqi Rural District, Shadian District, Charuymaq County, East Azerbaijan Province, Iran. At the 2006 census, its population was 53, in 9 families.

References 

Populated places in Charuymaq County